Country Club Park is a neighborhood in Los Angeles, California.

History

The name Country Club Park refers to the area's previous use.  In 1897, The Los Angeles Golf Club established a 9-hole course called the Windmill Links at Pico and Alvarado Street. Overcrowding inspired the organizers to move west and in 1899, the club moved  to the corner of Pico and Western (the area that is now Country Club Park). The course remained there until 1910, at which time  it moved to Holmby Hills.

After The Los Angeles Golf Club moved west, Isaac Milbank, with partner George Chase, subdivided the property for mostly large homes and mansions. Country Club Park matured in the 1920s and homes were constructed in the latest architectural styles: Craftsman, Tudor Revival, Spanish Colonial Revival, Colonial Revival and Mediterranean Revival.

In the wake of the U.S. Supreme Court ruling in Shelley v. Kraemer (1948) which struck down racial exclusionary covenants, Country Club Park was one of the first affluent neighborhoods in Los Angeles to allow blacks to purchase homes.

In 2010, the neighborhood was designated a Los Angeles Historic Preservation Overlay Zone because of the large number of intact buildings dating back to the earliest phases of Los Angeles’ development.

Geography
Country Club Park is bounded by Olympic Boulevard on the north, Crenshaw Boulevard on the west, Pico Boulevard on the south, and Western Avenue on the east. The neighborhood of Arlington Heights is directly south.  Wilshire Park is north. Oxford Square is west.

Country Club Park is partially gated; three streets that intersect Pico Boulevard are closed to through-traffic.

Parks and recreation

 Country Club Park Heritage Plaza - 1015 South Wilton Place. It has a children's play area, picnic tables, and a walking path.

In Media

 American Horror Story (pilot episode)

Designed and built in 1902 by Alfred Rosenheim, the president of the American Institute of Architects' Los Angeles chapter, the Collegiate Gothic-style single family home is located at 1120 Westchester Place.  The home was previously used as a convent. An adjoining chapel was removed from exterior shots using CGI.

After the pilot episode, filming continued on sets constructed to be an exact replica of the house. Details such as Lewis Comfort Tiffany stained glass windows, and hammered bronze light fixtures, were re-created to preserve the look of the house.

 Ali
 Daddy Day Care
 Running with Scissors

Notable residents
 Joel Fluellen, actor
Lena Horne, entertainer
Mahalia Jackson, gospel singer
Thomas Kilgore Jr., clergyman and human rights activist
Hattie McDaniel, actress
Lou Rawls, singer
Marl Young, musician and arranger

References

Central Los Angeles
Neighborhoods in Los Angeles